Nalla Thanni Theevu is an island situated in the Gulf of Mannar about 4 kilometers south-east of the coast of Tamil Nadu, India. It is one of the three uninhabited islands in the Gulf of Mannar the others being Krusadai Island and Muyal Island. It forms a part of the Kadaladi taluk of Ramanathapuram district.

References 

Islands of Tamil Nadu
Uninhabited islands of India
Islands of India